Stephen Robert Clark Sr. (born 1966) is the Chief United States district judge of the United States District Court for the Eastern District of Missouri. He is the founder and former managing partner of the St. Louis-based Runnymede Law Group.

Biography 

Clark earned his Bachelor of Arts from the University of Notre Dame and his Juris Doctor from Saint Louis University School of Law, where he was a member of the National Moot Court Team.

Legal career 

Prior to founding Runnymede in 2008, Clark was an equity partner at Husch Blackwell LLP, an equity shareholder at Polsinelli PC, and an officer at Greensfelder, Hemker & Gale, P.C. Earlier in his practice, he served as a municipal prosecutor, trying over 200 cases. Throughout his career, Clark represented clients pro bono and volunteered for numerous civic and charitable organizations. He also argued appeals in several federal and state appellate courts, including the Eighth and Tenth Circuits and the Supreme Court of Missouri.

Federal judicial service 

On April 10, 2018, President Donald Trump announced his intent to nominate Clark to serve as a United States District Judge of the United States District Court for the Eastern District of Missouri. On April 12, 2018, his nomination was sent to the Senate. He was nominated to the seat vacated by Judge Carol E. Jackson, who retired on August 31, 2017. On July 11, 2018, a hearing on his nomination was held before the Senate Judiciary Committee. On September 13, 2018, his nomination was reported out of committee by an 11–10 vote. Democrats opposed his nomination due to Clark's positions on abortion and LGBT rights.

On January 3, 2019, his nomination was returned to the President under Rule XXXI, Paragraph 6 of the United States Senate. On January 23, 2019, President Trump announced his intent to renominate Clark for a federal judgeship. His nomination was sent to the Senate later that day. On February 7, 2019, his nomination was reported out of committee by a 12–10 vote. On May 21, 2019, the Senate invoked cloture on his nomination by a 53–45 vote. On May 22, 2019, his nomination was confirmed by a 53–45 vote. He received his judicial commission on June 12, 2019. He was sworn in on June 14, 2019. He became chief judge on December 16, 2022.

Memberships 

He has been  a member of the Federalist Society since 2009.

See also
Donald Trump judicial appointment controversies

References

External links 
 
 Biography at Ballotpedia

1966 births
Living people
20th-century American lawyers
21st-century American judges
21st-century American lawyers
Federalist Society members
Judges of the United States District Court for the Eastern District of Missouri
Missouri lawyers
Missouri Republicans
People from Evanston, Illinois
Saint Louis University School of Law alumni
United States district court judges appointed by Donald Trump
University of Notre Dame alumni